Hilary Boniface Ng'weno (1938-2021) was a Kenyan historian and journalist.  The Harvard-educated scientist was born in Nairobi in 1938, to the late Morris Onyango. After graduating from Harvard with a degree in nuclear physics, Ng'weno worked as a reporter for the Daily Nation for nine months before his appointment as the newspaper’s first Kenyan editor-in-chief.  He resigned in 1965 and established a successful career as a journalist for more than forty years.  In 1973, together with journalist Terry Hirst, he founded Joe, a political satire comic magazine that circulated in many parts of Africa until the late seventies when its publication ceased. He is best known as the editor-in-chief of the Weekly Review, a weekly newsmagazine than ran from 1975 to 1999. He is also the founder of The Nairobi Times and the first independent TV news station in Kenya, STV. He was the producer of documentary videos on Kenyan history, including the Making of a Nation and Kenya's Darkest Hour.

Career in journalism
In 1975, Ng'weno founded The Weekly Review, a journal of political news, commentary and analysis followed in 1977 by The Nairobi Times, a Sunday newspaper that later became a daily.  At the beginning, The Weekly Review and The Nairobi Times being locally owned enterprises, fared well in a field dominated by the (then) foreign owned Daily Nation and The Standard but like other local papers, they faced stiff competition from the established papers for little or lack of advertising from the mostly foreign companies in Kenya.  Because the advertising community was still controlled by foreigners, it tended to favour the foreign owned publications.  Advertisers were also not too keen to deal with publications that were likely to stir the wrath of the government with inflammatory political reports.

Ng'weno's publications lasted an impressive length of time.  His publications continued to gain popularity, and The Weekly Review went on to dominate the weekly news scene for more than 20 years, becoming one of Africa’s best news magazines.  Due to diminishing revenue from advertising sales, Ng'weno however, sold The Nairobi Times in 1983 to KANU, Kenya's then ruling party.  The paper was renamed The Kenya Times, but its popularity suffered, as it was seen to be the mouthpiece of an oppressive government in a political era likened to dictatorship.  The Kenya Times wound up in July 2010.

Ng'weno diversified his media empire, which included other periodicals such as The Financial Review, The Industrial Review and Rainbow, a monthly children’s magazine.  His publishing company, Stellascope was acquired by KANU when the latter purchased The Nairobi Times. The Weekly Review folded on May 17, 1999 after 24 years of publication and Ng'weno moved on to television broadcasting launching a television station, STV Kenya.

Following the sale of STV in 2000, Ng'weno reinvented himself as a historian, drawing on materials from his journalistic career. Jointly with the Nation Media Group he produced the 15-part series, the Making of Nation (2007). Jointly with NTV, he has produced over 160 individual half-hour profiles of important figures in Kenya's history, a series entitled Makers of Nation.

Personal life
Hilary Ng'weno has been married  to Fleur (née Grandjouan), once a native of France, for nearly fifty years. Mrs. Ng'weno, a naturalist, writer and former editor, holds a BSc degree in conservation from the University of Michigan. She has been actively involved in environmental issues in Kenya for more than forty years, serving as Honorary Secretary to NatureKenya, (formerly the East Africa Natural History Society).  Their two daughters Amolo Ng'weno and Bettina Ng'weno are also distinguished achievers in education and media. The Harvard and Princeton educated Amolo served as deputy director of financial services for the poor at the Bill & Melinda Gates Foundation. In 1994, Amolo together with two other Kenyans, Ayisi Makatiani and Karanja Gakio, founded Africa Online,  one of the first internet service providers in Africa.  The three Kenyans met while still students in Cambridge, Massachusetts.  Dr. Bettina Ng'weno is an associate professor of African American and African studies at the University of California, Davis.

Death 
Hilary Ng'weno died on July 7, 2021 at his home after a long illness according to his family. He leaves behind his wife Fleur  Ng'weno, and two daughters Amolo and Bettina Ng'weno.

Positions held 
 Member of the Board of Trustees of the National Museums of Kenya (1964–68)
 Chairman of the Kenya Museum Society (1967–68)
 Chairman of Kenya Wildlife Service (1990–93)
 Trustee of World Wide Fund for Nature (1993–97)
 Member of the Council of African Advisers to the World Bank (1991–94)
 Chairman of the Kenya Revenue Authority (1995–97)
 Member of Presidential Economic Commission (1996–99)
 Member of the Population Advisory Committee of the MacArthur Foundation (1991–97)
 Chairman of the Advisory Board of the Rockefeller Foundation’s African Forum for Children’s Literacy in Science and Technology (1994–97)

Publications

Books 
 The Men From Pretoria (1977)
 The Day Kenyatta Died (1978)

Magazines 
 Joe, the full of humour magazine (together with artist Terry Hirst and Oscar Festus)

TV productions 
 Makers of a Nation, which won the Best TV Script: Hilary Ng'weno at the Kalasha Awards 2010.
 The Making of a Nation: Kenya’s Political History 1957-2007, a 14 half-hour documentary based on the political course of Kenya from pre-1963 to 2007.
 Kenya’s Darkest Hour

Prize 
 John D. Rockefeller III Award, 1968.

See also 
 Pioneer Journalist and Creative Thinker, in the Nation (2013).
 Profile of Hilary Ng'weno, on Kenyablogspot (2012) 
 Lamb, David, The Africans (1987).
 Hilary Ng'weno, interviewed by Bernth Lindfors, in : The African Book Publishing Record. Volume 5, Issue 3, pp. 157–161, ISSN (Online) 7865-8717, ISSN (Print) 0306-0322, //1979 published online: 20/10/2009.
 Rosenthal, Elizabeth, Birdwatcher: The Life of Roger Tory Peterson (2008).

References

External links

 How free is the press?, interview with Chaacha Mwita, at afronline.org.
 Kenya Times To Say Bye after 27 years at printweekmea.com.
 Fleur Ng'weno, wife of Hilary Ng'weno, in executive committee of Nature Kenya, at naturekenya.org.
 Biography of Claireve Grandjouan, archeologist and Fleur Ng'weno's sister, by Marjorie Susan Venit, at brown.edu.

1938 births
2021 deaths
Kenyan journalists
Kenyan Luhya people
Writers from Nairobi
Harvard University alumni